La Feuillie may refer to the following communes in France:

La Feuillie, Manche, in the Manche département 
La Feuillie, Seine-Maritime, in the Seine-Maritime] département